Norah Jeruto Tanui (born 2 October 1995) is a Kazakhstani (formerly Kenyan) steeplechase runner. She won the gold medal in the 3000 metres steeplechase at the 2022 World Athletics Championships.

She was the champion at the African Championships in Athletics in 2016. Currently Jeruto is an athlete of Altay Athletics club (professional track and field club) in Kazakhstan.

Career
Her international debut came at the 2011 African Cross Country Championships, where she placed sixth in the junior race to complete a Kenyan sweep of the top six. She ran the third fastest time ever for the 2000 metres steeplechase at the 2011 World Youth Championships in Athletics, recording 6:16.41 minutes to take the gold in spite of a heavy fall at the waterjump. Later that year she claimed the steeplechase title at the 2011 Commonwealth Youth Games, as well as a bronze in the 3000 metres flat. She missed out on selection for the 2012 World Junior Championships in Athletics.

She set a 3000 metres steeplechase best of 9:45.1 minutes at age fifteen, but struggled to improve on that in subsequent seasons. She was selected for Kenya's junior team at the 2015 IAAF World Cross Country Championships, but did not compete.

After a runner-up performance at the Kenyan Athletics Championships, setting a best of 9:28.5 minutes behind Lydia Rotich, Jeruto made her senior international debut at the 2016 African Championships in Athletics. A personal best run of 9:25.07 minutes at the competition brought her the steeplechase gold medal and a championship record.

Despite her ranking, she didn't participate at 2020 Tokyo Olympics, because she was still waiting for her allegiance to Kazakhstan which she has obtained on 30 January 2022.

2022
On May 28, 2022, at the Prefontaine Classic in Eugene, Oregon (third stop of the Diamond league) she ran the third fastest time ever by a woman at the 3000m steeplechase in 8.57.98. setting a world lead. She could've shaved half a second of that time as she thought she crossed the line 2–3 meters before the actual finish line.

On 20 July, she became the first athlete representing Kazakhstan to win at the World Championships in Eugene, establishing a new championship and national record of 8:53.02 in the same Hayward Field.

International competitions

Circuit wins and titles
  Diamond League champion 3000 m steeplechase: 2021
 3000 metres steeplechase wins, other events specified in parenthesis
 2017: Oslo Bislett Games
 2019: Oslo Bislett Games
 2021: Doha Diamond League, Eugene Prefontaine Classic, Zürich Weltklasse
 2022: Eugene Prefontaine Classic

References

External links

Living people
1995 births
Kazakhstani female steeplechase runners
Kenyan female steeplechase runners
Kazakhstani people of Kenyan descent
Kenyan emigrants to Kazakhstan
Diamond League winners
World Youth Championships in Athletics winners